The 100 metres at the Summer Olympics has been contested since the first edition of the multi-sport event. The men's 100 metres has been present on the Olympic athletics programme since 1896. The 100 metres is considered one of the blue ribbon events of the Olympics and is among the highest profile competitions at the games. It is the most prestigious 100 metres race at an elite level and is the shortest sprinting competition at the Olympics – a position it has held at every edition except for a brief period between 1900 and 1904, when a men's 60 metres was contested.

The first Olympic champions were Thomas Burke in the men's category and, 32 years later, Betty Robinson in the women's category. The Olympic records for the event are 9.63 seconds, set by Usain Bolt in 2012, and 10.61 seconds, set by Elaine Thompson-Herah in 2021. The world records for the event have been equalled or broken during the Olympics on seven occasions in the men's category and on twelve occasions in the women's.

Among the competing nations, the United States has had the most success in this event, having won sixteen golds in the men's race and nine in the women's race. Usain Bolt of Jamaica has won three consecutive titles (2008–16). Five other athletes have won back-to-back titles: Wyomia Tyus (1964–68), Carl Lewis (1984–88), Gail Devers (1992–96), Shelly-Ann Fraser-Pryce (2008–12), and Elaine Thompson-Herah (2016-2020). Merlene Ottey is the only athlete to win three medals without winning gold, with one silver and two bronze medals. Shelly-Ann Fraser-Pryce is the most decorated athlete in the event, male or female, having won 4 medals.

Many athletes that compete in this event also compete individually in the Olympic 200 metres and with their national teams in the Olympic 4×100 metres relay, with Jamaicans Usain Bolt and Elaine Thompson-Herah being the only athletes to do so more than once. Nine men have achieved the 100 metres and 200 metres 'Double' at the same Olympic Games - Archie Hahn (1904), Ralph Craig (1912), Percy Williams (1928), Eddie Tolan (1932), Jesse Owens (1936), Bobby Morrow (1956), Valeriy Borzov (1972), Carl Lewis (1984), and Usain Bolt (2008, 2012, 2016). Four of these men were also members of the winning team in the 4x100 meters relay at the same games - Jesse Owens (1936), Bobby Morrow (1956), Carl Lewis (1984), and Usain Bolt (2012, 2016). Two of these men have won a fourth gold medal at the same games - Archie Hahn in the now defunct 60 metres, and both Jesse Owens and Carl Lewis in the long jump.

Seven women have achieved the 100 metres and 200 metres 'Double' at the same Olympic Games - Fanny Blankers-Koen (1948), Marjorie Jackson (1952), Betty Cuthbert (1956), Wilma Rudolph (1960), Renate Stecher (1972), Florence Griffith-Joyner (1988), and Elaine Thompson-Herah (2016) and (2021). Five of these women were also members of the winning team in the 4x100 meters relay at the same games - Fanny Blankers-Koen (1948), Betty Cuthbert (1956), Wilma Rudolph (1960), Florence Griffith-Joyner (1988) and Elaine Thompson-Herah (2021). Fanny Blankers-Koen is the only one of these women to win four gold medals at the same games by winning the 80 metres hurdles in 1948.

Competition format 

The Olympic 100 metres competitions are carried out under standard international rules, as set by the International Association of Athletics Federations (IAAF). The races are segregated by gender, with one for men and one for women. The 100 m is usually held at the beginning of the Olympic athletics programme as this allows athletes to compete in other events held later at the games – many 100 m athletes also compete in the 200 metres and the 4×100 metres relay events.

Traditionally there are four rounds of competition: heats, quarter-finals, semi-finals, and finals. Prior to 1964, finals featured six athletes. For all Olympic competitions from 1964 onwards—allowing for a sufficient number of athletes being present—each race features eight runners. Athletes are seeded by past performance to ensure an even balance of quality across the heats and allow the best runners to progress to the later stages. Usually in the first two rounds the top three runners progress to the next stage. A small number of other athletes also progress as the fastest non-qualifiers (or "fastest losers") through a repechage system. Prior to 2012, the semi-finals stage comprised two races of eight athletes and the top four finishers in each race (regardless of time) were entered into the final.

Several amendments were made to the competition format in 2012. Any participant not in possession of an Olympic qualifying standard time is entered into the preliminary round. Qualifiers in this round progress to the first round proper. The semi-finals stage is divided into three races: the top two progress to the final by right and the two fastest non-qualifiers complete the eight finalists. Changes to the international false start rules were also introduced – any validly recorded reaction time to the starter's pistol of below 0.1 seconds will result in instant disqualification. At the 2004 and 2008 Olympics one false start was allowed per race, with any subsequent false start resulting in disqualification for the offending athletes. At Olympics prior to 2004 each athlete was allowed one false start, with a second false start leading to removal from the field.

The top three finishers in the final are awarded a gold, silver and bronze medal, respectively. If runners cannot be separated by their time (recorded to one hundredth of a second) further analysis is used to distinguish their times to the thousandth of a second. In the 2008 Women's 100 m final the minor medallists Sherone Simpson and Kerron Stewart could not be separated by this method and were both awarded the silver medal. Medal positions in a 100 m race have only been shared on one other occasion in Olympic history: Alajos Szokolyi and Francis Lane were joint third at the 1896 men's final.

Participation 
Starting with 15 men from eight nations at the inaugural 1896 Olympic 100 m, participation in the event reached its peak at the 2000 Sydney Games, where 179 male and female athletes from 100 nations were present. The number of competitors and nations in the event has seen an increasing historical trend. This increase has been mostly linear, though participation was affected by the Olympic boycotts of 1976, 1980 and 1984. The linear trend stopped after the 2000 peak and has steadily decreased in subsequent Summer Olympics.

Men's participation reached its highest at the 1996 Atlanta Olympics, which featured 104 men from 75 nations. Women's participation began in 1928, with 31 women from 13 nations competing, and reached an all-time high at the 2008 Beijing Games, which had 85 women representing 69 nations. The 2008 and 2012 editions reversed the historical gender bias towards male participation, as women outnumbered men at the Olympic 100 m for the first time.

As the governing body for the sport of athletics, the International Association of Athletics Federations (IAAF) applies qualifying standards to the competition. This aims to encourage high level performances at the Olympic Games and contain the number of potential entries (the IAAF aims to cap Olympic participation in athletics events at 2000 athletes). There are two types of qualifying standard: the "A" standard and the "B" standard. Each National Olympic Committee (NOC) may enter up to three athletes who have obtained the "A" standard, or one athlete with the "B" standard. If a NOC has no qualifying athletes in any Olympic athletic event, it may enter one non-qualified athlete – the 100 m is a frequent choice for this type of entry given the brevity of the event. Athletes must achieve the qualifying time without wind-assistance at an officially authorised event within a certain time period, which typically begins from the year prior to the Olympics and extends up to three weeks before the games. The IAAF prohibits entrants who do not reach the age of sixteen in that Olympic year, but there is no upper age limit. The IAAF qualifying standards for the 100 m have become progressively more stringent since 2000.

On top of IAAF standards, national governing bodies may apply their own participation restrictions. These principally come in four forms: stricter national qualifying times, reduced time periods for qualifying performances, performances in the event at a national Olympic trials, and decisions of national selection committees. Smaller nations do not typically apply these additional criteria due to the smaller numbers of sprinters eligible to compete. Larger nations, and nations with strong traditions in sprinting, often have long-running histories of Olympic 100 m trials (such as at the United States Olympic Trials). Participation for a country also demands that the athlete hold respective citizenship and is not subject to a competitive ban through anti-doping rules.

World Athletics in 2019 announced that, following the inauguration of their World Rankings platform, that in addition to those who achieved the Olympic standard, placing in the top 32 of the rankings will serve as a qualification method for athletes. (For example, if someone comes 3rd in the 100m finals of their national championships in 10.14, if he is 22nd in the World Rankings, he has qualified for the games).

Data notes
Numbers do not include non-starting athletes. There have been two Olympic 100 m non-starters: Estonia's Reinhold Saulmann in 1920, and Kim Collins in 2012 – the latter was banned from competing by the St. Kitts and Nevis Olympic Committee for defying their orders and leaving the Olympic camp to stay with his wife.
Nations are above defined as the competing Olympic team as opposed to athletes' legal nationalities – the various Unified teams and Independent Olympian teams are thus each treated as one nation at that Olympic Games.

Biological factors

Age 
The 100 m requires a high level of athleticism and as a result most of the participants in the Olympics are aged between 18 and 35 – which is roughly contiguous with the period of peak physical fitness in humans. Consequently, the vast majority of participants in the Olympic 100 m fall within this age range. As of 2020, the qualification rules prohibit athletes younger than 16 at the end of the year of the Games.

The record for the youngest athlete to participate in the Olympic 100 m is held by Katura Marae, who was 14 when she represented Vanuatu at the 2004 Athens Olympics. Merlene Ottey holds the records for both the oldest participant and the oldest medallist, having won bronze at age 40 in 2000 and reached the Olympic semi-finals four years later. (Ottey is also the most frequent participant having competed in the Olympic 100 m an unrivalled six times from 1984 to 2004). The first women's champion, Betty Robinson in 1928, remains the youngest gold medallist for the event at 16 years old, while a 32-year-old Linford Christie became the oldest 100 m Olympic champion in 1992.

Gender 
Since introduction of testing by the IAAF in the early-20th century, female sprinters may be subject to gender verification. This rule was first formally applied to the 100 m at the 1968 Mexico Olympics. No 100 m sprinter has been publicly barred at an Olympic competition. However, there have been historic cases involving two women's medallists: 1932 champion Stanisława Walasiewicz and 1964 bronze medallist Ewa Kłobukowska, both of Poland. Walasiewicz endured accusations during her career due to her appearance, but was never subject to a test. An autopsy following her death in a shooting revealed ambiguous genitalia. Walasiewicz accused Helen Stephens (who beat her in the 1936 final) of being male and, despite there being no relevant rules on the matter, officials performed a physical examination of Stephens' external genitalia and concluded that she was female. Kłobukowska was not tested at the Olympics, thus did not lose her Olympic medals, but was subsequently disqualified at the 1967 European Cup on the basis of having a chromosomal mosaic. Intersex athletes are restricted from competition in the 100 m without having undergone surgery and hormonal therapy, as a result of the 2003 Stockholm consensus ruling by the IOC.

Race 

Olympic 100 m medallists in the early phase of the Modern Olympic Games were principally white, Western sprinters of European descent, largely reflecting the euro-centric make up of the nations that took part and the ideological environment of racial segregation at the time. As the Olympic competition began to attract wider international participation, athletes with African heritage began to reach and eventually dominate the 100 m Olympic podium, particularly African-Americans and Afro-Caribbeans.

Eddie Tolan became the first non-white winner of the event in 1932 and this signified the start of a prolonged period of success by black male sprinters; since 1932 only five men's Olympic champions in the event have not had significant African heritage. The women's event was dominated by runners of European descent until Wilma Rudolph won the title in 1960. Soviet and German women returned to the podium in the period from 1972 to 1980, but since then African-American and Jamaican women have won the great majority of 100 m medals. Dominance in the men's event has been particularly pronounced from 1984 to 2016, during which time in a span of almost 40 years all the men's Olympic 100 m finalists have been of African heritage.

In the 2020 Olympics, Chinese sprinter Su Bingtian ran 9.83 in his semi-final heat and became the first athlete without African heritage to reach the final since 1980 within the span of 40 years, setting an unofficial fastest 60 metres split record en route. 9.83 is also the second fastest semi-final time and made him the fifth fastest man in the history of 100 metres at the Olympics behind Usain Bolt, Yohan Blake, Justin Gatlin and Marcel Jacobs.

Most commentators attribute this statistical discrepancy to genetic rather than to cultural factors.

Doping 
All athletes who participate in the Olympic 100 m competition are subject to the World Anti-Doping Code –the IAAF and International Olympic Committee (IOC) are both signatories. Mandatory in-competition drug testing was introduced at the 1968 Summer Olympics.

One of the most prominent cases of doping at the Olympics, and in sport as a whole, occurred during the 1988 Seoul Olympics. Ben Johnson entered the race as the reigning 100 metres world record holder and won the Olympic final, raising his arm in victory, in a new world record of 9.79 seconds to much fanfare. Soon after being awarded the gold medal the results of his post-race drug test revealed his urine contained traces of stanozolol (a banned steroid). Johnson later admitted to doping, but he and his coach Charlie Francis still claimed he had his drink spiked at the Olympics, as Johnson was taking a different type of steroid at the time. The positive test had long-lasting effects on public perception of the sport and advanced the case for more stringent drug testing. The Canadian government launched an investigation into drugs in sport, known as the Dubin Inquiry, the following year. The 1988 Olympic men's 100 metres final has been referred to as "the dirtiest race in history", as only two of the eight finalists remained free of doping issues during their careers.

Ekaterini Thanou, the 2000 women's silver medallist, was barred from the 2004 Athens Olympics after failing to attend a pre-competition drugs test (her third consecutive missed test). The Greek sprinter and her teammate Kostas Kenteris were convicted of staging a motorcycle crash to avoid the test, but this was overturned on appeal. Her doping ban remained as they admitted to having missed the tests. Tameka Williams was banned from competing in the 100 m at the 2012 Olympics when, at the Olympic village, she admitted to the Saint Kitts and Nevis management team that she had been ingesting a banned substance. Bulgaria's Tezdzhan Naimova had her 2008 Olympic performance annulled and received a two-year ban after it was proved that she had tampered with her drug test a month prior to the competition.

Another high-profile doping case involved the 2000 Olympic women's 100 m champion Marion Jones, though no doping infractions occurred during the Olympics. Having been one of the stars of the games—she won three gold and two bronze medals in track and field events—Jones was later implicated in doping through the BALCO scandal. She lied to federal agents and a grand jury during questioning around the scandal, but later admitted in 2007 to using Tetrahydrogestrinone (THG) during the period of her Olympic success. The IOC annulled all her Olympic results, including her 100 m title. Given that the 2000 women's runner-up Ekaterini Thanou had herself been banned for drug usage, the IOC chose not to upgrade her to the gold medal position, but rather leave the position vacant. Working around the dilemma, the IOC decided to raise bronze medallist Tayna Lawrence to joint silver and fourth-placed Merlene Ottey to the bronze medal position.

In spite of the relatively few occasions in which 100 m sprinters have failed doping tests at the Olympics, numerous Olympic sprinters have been banned outside the competition or implicated otherwise, including many medallists. Two-time Olympic champion Carl Lewis had a positive drug test for stimulants at the US Olympic trials. The United States Olympic Committee accepted his claim of inadvertent use, since a dietary supplement he ingested was found to contain "Ma huang", the Chinese name for Ephedra (ephedrine is known to help weight loss). The 1992 Olympic champion Linford Christie was banned for nandrolone later in his career. Angel Guillermo Heredia accused the 2000 Olympic champion Maurice Greene of doping; Greene denied this but admitted to paying for "stuff" for his training mates. Justin Gatlin, the men's gold medallist in 2004, served a doping suspension both before and after his Olympic win, and returned to the podium at the 2012 Olympics. The men's runner-up in 2012, Yohan Blake, was banned for consuming a stimulant in 2009.

On the women's side, the Olympic 100 m was affected by state-sponsored doping in East Germany. Stasi documents released after the fall of the Berlin Wall revealed extensive drug usage by Olympic sprinters, including the 1976 and 1980 silver medallists Renate Stecher and Marlies Göhr, as well as the 1988 bronze medallist Heike Drechsler. Shelly-Ann Fraser, twice Olympic champion, received a six-month ban in 2010 for taking a prohibited narcotic for pain relief. A similar system was in place in the Soviet Union with major revelations concerning the Soviet state-sponsored doping program in preparation for the 1984 Olympics coming to light in 2016. The 2008 runner-up Sherone Simpson was banned in 2013 after a positive test for a stimulant and two-time bronze medallist Veronica Campbell-Brown failed a test for a diuretic that same year. A fourth Jamaican medallist, Merlene Ottey, received a ban for the steroid nandrolone in 1999 but this was rescinded on appeal due to laboratory errors.

Medal summary

Men

Multiple medallists

Medals by country

Women

Multiple medallists

Medals by country

Overall

Medals by country

Olympic record progression 
The best time for the 100 m set during Olympic competition is known as the Olympic record. To count as an official record, the race and the equipment used must adhere to IAAF international rules. Hand-timed results were the standard until 1975, when fully automatic timing (FAT) became the preferred method for officially measuring athletes' times. Further to this wind conditions must be measured and any time achieved with a wind speed of over 2.0 metres per second in a direction behind the athlete is treated as wind-assisted and cannot be taken for an Olympic record mark.

Since the first men's Olympic record of 12.2 seconds by Frank Lane in 1896, the record has been broken 13 times and matched 24 times. Twenty-eight men have been holder (or co-holder) of the record. Usain Bolt is the current record holder with 9.63, set in 2012. Further to this standing men's world record for the 100 m has been equalled five times in Olympic competition and improved twice (by Carl Lewis in 1988 with 9.92 and by Bolt in 2008 with 9.69). Ben Johnson's time of 9.79 was annulled before it was ratified as either an Olympic or world record.

Since the initial women's Olympic record of 13.0 seconds was set by Anni Holdmann in 1928, it has been broken 18 times and equalled 17 further times. The standing women's 100 m world record has been improved five times during Olympic competition and equalled seven times.

The tables below refer to hand-timing for races held prior to the 1972 Summer Olympics and to fully automatic times after that point, when they became the standard for the Olympics. Hand-timed results that matched the Olympic record are treated as equalling the mark, with the exception of any athletes that matched that time but finished behind another athlete in their race.

Men 

 Carl Lewis's time of 9.92 seconds in the 1988 Olympic final was initially second to Ben Johnson's 9.79, but Johnson was disqualified soon after due to a failed drug test.

Women

Finishing times 
The Olympic 100 m is the most prestigious competition for the distance and it attracts elite level, international competitors. The winner of the race is occasionally referred to as "the world's fastest" man or woman, reflecting the high level of the competition and the quality of performances. , the current Olympic records of 9.63 for men and 10.62 seconds for women rank as the second and third fastest times in history, for men and women respectively. The standard of performances at the Olympics has progressed in line with the discipline as a whole and the times in the final often rank highly in the end-of-season lists. National records and personal bests are frequently improved at the event by sprinters from large and small nations alike, as most elite athletes aim to reach peak race fitness for the Olympics.

The 2012 men's final was the fastest 100 m race in history, collectively: the top five men ran under 9.90 seconds for the first time ever and seven of the eight finalists ran under 10 seconds (the last runner suffered an injury). Tyson Gay became the fastest non-medallist in history at that race with his time of 9.80 seconds. Similarly, the 2012 women's final was, collectively, the fastest women's 100 m race ever: seven of the eight finalists ran 11 seconds or faster for the first time, with Veronica Campbell-Brown becoming the fastest ever bronze medallist with her time of 10.81 seconds and Tianna Madison becoming the fastest non-medallist with her time of 10.85 seconds.

Top ten fastest Olympic times 

 H – time recorded in the heats
 QF – time recorded in the quarter-finals
 SF – time recorded in the semi-finals

Note:
Florence Griffith-Joyner ran 10.54 (+3.0) and 10.70 (+2.6) in the finals and semifinals of the 100m at the 1988 Seoul Olympics, however, both were over the legal wind speed limit of +2.0 m/s.

Best time for place 

 Florence Griffith-Joyner ran 10.54 to win the final of the 1988 Olympic Games, but the wind was over the legal limit (+3.0)

Intercalated Games 
The 1906 Intercalated Games were held in Athens and at the time were officially recognised as part of the Olympic Games series, with the intention being to hold a games in Greece in two-year intervals between the internationally held Olympics. However, this plan never came to fruition and the International Olympic Committee (IOC) later decided not to recognise these games as part of the official Olympic series. Some sports historians continue to treat the results of these games as part of the Olympic canon.

At this event a men's 100 m was held and 1904 Olympic champion Archie Hahn of the United States won the race. Another American, Fay Moulton, was the runner-up and Australian Nigel Barker was the bronze medallist.

Non-canonical Olympic events 
In addition to the main 1900 Olympic men's 100 metres, two further 100 m events were held that year. A handicap race attracted 32 athletes from 10 countries and was won by Edmund Minahan, an American semi-finalist in the main 100 m competition, which had taken place five days earlier. A 100 m event for professionals only was held several weeks later. Four entrants are known and the winner was Edgar Bredin, a British former world record holder.

A 100 m professionals handicap race is also believed to have been held in 1900. In 1904 a 100-yard dash handicap race was contested and an American, C. Hastedt, was the victor.

These events are no longer considered part of the official Olympic history of the 100 m or the athletics programme in general. Consequently, medals from these races have not been assigned to nations on the all-time medal tables.

Cultural impact 

The 100 metres is typically considered one of the blue ribbon Olympic track and field events, and of the Olympic Games as a whole. The Olympic 100 m finals, particularly the men's, are among the most popular events from any sport at the Olympics – the 2012 Olympic men's 100 metres final was the most watched event at the London Games by British audiences (with 20 million television viewers) while in the United States that event was the third-most viewed Olympic clip.

The high-profile nature of 100 m Olympic finals in some countries has served to encourage participation in sport among the wider public, particularly in short sprinting. Successive generations of athletes cite previous 100 m Olympic champions as the reason for their entering the sport. The history of the event has had particular impact for African-American athletes: Jesse Owens' Olympic 100 m gold was an early example of a black American achieving success on an international stage while Wilma Rudolph's 1960 win inspired many black American women. Owens' 100 m victory at the 1936 Berlin Olympics (one of four gold medals he won over seven days at the games) helped challenge notions of white supremacy that were popular during that era.

1996 Olympic 100 metre champion Donovan Bailey from Canada had his billing as "World's Fastest Man" questioned by the American media, who instead promoted 1996 Olympic 200 metre and 400 metre champion Michael Johnson from the United States. After much sparring between the two athletes and media of their respective countries, an unsanctioned 150-metre race was held at the SkyDome in Toronto to settle the matter, with Bailey winning while Johnson pulled up injured, and they earned $1.5 million and $500,000, respectively.

The Olympic 100 metres has been covered by several film documentaries. Chariots of Fire, a 1981 historical drama focusing on Harold Abrahams' victory at the 1924 Paris Olympics, is among the most prominent. The film won four Academy Awards, is often listed among polls for the best sports and Olympics films., and was ranked 19th in the British Film Institute's 100 Best British Films Wilma Rudolph was a central figure in The Grand Olympics, an academy-Award nominated documentary about the 1960 Rome Olympics, where Rudolph's 100 m feats earned her the nickname La Gazzella Negra (The Black Gazelle). The 1988 Olympic final, featuring Ben Johnson and Carl Lewis has been the topic of documentaries, including ESPN's "9.79*" from the 30 for 30 series, as well as non-fiction books, such as Richard Moore's The Dirtiest Race in History.

Across the sport of track and field, Olympic 100 m champions have often featured on Athlete of the Year lists. Carl Lewis (1984), Evelyn Ashford (1984), Florence Griffith-Joyner (1988), Usain Bolt (2008) and Elaine Thompson-Herah (2021) were chosen as Track & Field News Athlete of the Year in the year of their Olympic victories. Lewis, Griffith-Joyner, Bolt and Thompson-Herah were also awarded the title of IAAF World Athlete of the Year for their Olympic feats.

See also 
 100 metres at the World Championships in Athletics

References 
Olympic record progressions
Mallon, Bill (2012). TRACK & FIELD ATHLETICS - OLYMPIC RECORD PROGRESSIONS. Track and Field News. Retrieved on 2014-01-26.
Specific

External links 
 IAAF 100 metres homepage
 Official Olympics website
 Olympic athletics records from Track & Field News

 
Olympics
100 metres